Androstanolone propionate (brand name Pesomax), also known as stanolone propionate or dihydrotestosterone propionate (DHTP), as well as 5α-androstan-17β-ol-3-one 17β-propionate, is a synthetic androgen and anabolic steroid and a dihydrotestosterone ester that is marketed in Italy. It is used as an injectable and acts as a prodrug of androstanolone (stanolone, dihydrotestosterone, DHT).

See also
 List of androgen esters § Dihydrotestosterone esters

References

Androgens and anabolic steroids
Androstanes
Dihydrotestosterone esters
Prodrugs
Propionate esters